Ferdulf or Fardulf, originally from the territories of Liguria, was the Duke of Friuli at some point between the end of the reign of Cunincpert (688-700) and the beginning of that of Aripert II (701-12). There is no evidence to associate his tenure to the year 705 alone or indeed to suggest that it was very brief.. Paul the Deacon described him as 'a man tricky and conceited' who had obtained the dukedom after the death of Duke Ado.

He was said to have desired "the glory of a victory over the Slavs" (Paul the Deacon, Historia Langobardorum VI, xxiv). He paid some Slavs to invade his country in order that he might fend them off, but some of the Slav army raided the pastureland and carried off livestock as booty. Argait (whose name means 'cowardly, inert or worthless' in Langobardic), the local magistrate, or 'sculdahis', chased them, but could not overtake them. Subsequently, Ferdulf met Argait and asked what had become of the robbers. Argait indicated that they had fled. Ferdulf enraged is reported by Paul to have said 'when could you do anything bravely, you whose name, Argait, comes from the word coward.' Argait responds that neither of them should die 'until others know which of us is the greater coward.'

A few days later, the real Slav army which Ferdulf had paid arrived and took up a position on a hill. Ferdulf initially decided to try to challenge them on more level ground, but Argait charged up the hill and, fearful of being labelled a coward, Ferdulf followed. The entire Lombard cavalry was killed and the Friulian nobility decimated. Both Argait and Ferdulf died. 

The episode is interesting since the conversation between Ferdulf and Argait is said by Paul to have been undertaken in 'vulgaria verba' and may indicate that Langobardic was still a spoken vernacular in the north-east of Italy. Whilst Paul's source for this story is not known, and he provides no further notice regarding Ferdulf, it is likely that it depends upon oral traditions that he may have encountered in Friuli.

References 
 Paul the Deacon. Historia Langobardorum. Translated by William Dudley Foulke. University of Pennsylvania: 1907.
 Hodgkin, Thomas. Italy and her Invaders. Clarendon Press: 1895.
 Gasparri,Stefano. 'i Duchi Longobardi', Roma, 1978.
 Capo,Lidia. 'Paolo Diacono:Storia dei Longobardi', Vicenza, 1992.

Dukes of Friuli
Lombard warriors
8th-century rulers in Europe
8th-century Lombard people
7th-century births
705 deaths